The 1938 Saint Louis Billikens football team represented Saint Louis University during the 1938 college football season, their 39th season in existence. They finished the season 3–5–2 and 1–1–1 in the Missouri Valley Conference.

Against fellow MVC team, they lost to Tulsa, beat , and tied Washington University. They recorded losses against Ole Miss of the Southeastern Conference (SEC) and Missouri of the Big Six Conference.

Schedule

References

Saint Louis
Saint Louis Billikens football seasons
Saint Louis Billikens football